TTT Rīga is a professional women's basketball club based in Riga, Latvia. "TTT" means Tram and Trolley Trust. The team held its first official game on 5 November 1958. The next 25 years are known as the First Golden age of the club. Internationally, the club was also known as Daugava Riga, due to the fact that Daugava was the predecessor of TTT Riga in the 1950s.

History
Led by famous Latvian basketball player and coach Olgerts "Bohums" Altbergs, TTT Riga conquered its first European title in 1960, winning the European Cup for Women's Champion Clubs (since 1992 known as EuroLeague Women). Dzidra Uztupe-Karamiseva, Vita Silina-Luka (Karpova), Dzintra Kiepe-Baka and other outstanding players of the time bring women basketball to new levels. Seventeen more European titles were added during next 22 years – achievement unequalled until this day.

The rise of Uljana Semjonova, who joined TTT Riga in 1965, at the age of 13, confirmed golden status of „TTT". From 1964 to 1975 TTT earned 12 consecutive European titles. In 18 seasons of international competition Uljana Semjonova never lost a game in national team competition, a record that will almost certainly never be repeated.

The late 1980s and 1990s marked a decline of the once famous club. The best Latvian players, with Semojonova being the first one, continued their professional careers in France, Spain and Italy. It took ten years after Latvia regained independence, while TTT re-entered the Liliana Ronchetti cup in 2001. Their entry followed only five years later.

The autumn of 2006 was a turning point in history of the club. New leadership and new management launched a long term project to unite the best Latvian players under the famous club name, first foreign internationals – like Brazilian and WNBA star Iziane Castro Marques – came to Latvia. In the spring of 2007 TTT Riga after one year silence regained the Latvian title and applied for the participation in FIBA Euroleague Women. Season of 2007–2008 will be the 50th for the club.

Players of note

Naismith Memorial Basketball Hall of Famers
 Uļjana Semjonova, C, 1982–1983, Inducted 1993

Current roster

Notable past players
Uļjana Semjonova
Ieva Tāre
Iciss Tillis

Championships
FIBA's EuroLeague Women: 18 (1960–1962, 1964–75, 1977, 1981, 1982)
FIBA's Ronchetti Cup: 1 (1987)
Eastern European Women's Basketball League: 2 (2016, 2019)
USSR Championships: 21
Latvian Championships: 14 (1992, 1993, 1995, 2001-2005, 2007, 2008, 2010, 2011, 2014, 2015)

References

External links
Official website 

Sport in Riga
Women's basketball teams in Latvia
EuroLeague Women clubs
Basketball teams established in 1958